Aminata is a West African given name; it may refer to:
 Aminata Diaw (1959–2017), Senegalese academic and political philosopher
 Aminata Maïga Ka (born 1940), Senegalese writer
 Aminata Mbengue Ndiaye, member of the Pan-African Parliament
 Aminata Savadogo (born 1993), Latvian singer
 Aminata Sow Fall (born 1941), Senegalese-born author
 Aminata Traoré (born 1942), Malian author, politician, and political activist
 Sidibé Aminata Diallo, Malian academic and politician